The men's Keirin at the 2016 Olympic Games in Rio de Janeiro took place at the Rio Olympic Velodrome on 16 August.

The medals were presented by Prince Tunku Imran, IOC member, Malaysia and Dr Wagih Azzam, Vice President of the UCI.

Competition format
The Keirin races involved 5.5 laps of the track behind a motorcycle, followed by a 2.5 lap sprint to the finish. The tournament consisted of preliminary heats and repechages, a semi-finals round, and the finals. The heats and repechages narrowed the field to 12. The semi-finals divided the remaining 12 into six finalists. The finals round also included a ranking race for 7th to 12th place.

Schedule 
All times are Brasília Time

Results

First round
Top two in each heat qualified directly for the second round; the remainder advanced to the first round repechages.

Heat 1

Heat 3

Heat 2

Heat 4

 Relegation for moving down towards the inside of the track and forcing other competitor off the track
 Relegation and Warning for moving down towards the inside of the track when a rival was already there

First round Repechages
The winner of each heat qualified for the second round.

Heat 1

Heat 3

Heat 2

Heat 4

 Relegation for entering the sprinter's lane when the opponent was already there

Second round
First three riders in each semi qualified for the final; the remainder advanced to the small final (for places 7–12).

Heat 1

Heat 2

Finals
The final classification is determined in the ranking finals.

Final (places 7–12)

Final (places 1–6)

References

keirin
Cycling at the Summer Olympics – Men's keirin
Men's events at the 2016 Summer Olympics